Dippach (Luxembourgish: Dippech) is a commune and small town in south-western Luxembourg.

Dippach may also refer to:

Dippach, Thuringia, a municipality in the Wartburgkreis district in Thuringia in Germany

See also
Dippach-Reckange railway station
Duppach, a municipality in Rhineland-Palatinate, Germany.